Even is a Brazilian construction and real estate company. It is listed on B3, the São Paulo Stock Exchange.

Even has operated in the real estate sector for more than 40 years and is one of the largest developers and builders in the São Paulo metropolitan area. The company maintains a strategic focus on the cities of São Paulo, Rio de Janeiro and Porto Alegre.

The company has vertically integrated operations, executing all the development stages of its projects, from site prospecting, property development and brokerage activities to the project‘s construction. Even also have two brokerage companies: Even Vendas and Even More, both of which operate in 100% of the company‘s projects selling units and providing services exclusively for Even.

Major competitors include Cyrela Brazil Realty, Gafisa, Rossi Residencial, PDG Realty, Brookfield Incorporações, and MRV Engenharia.

In 2018, the President/CEO of the company became Leandro Melnick and the Vice President/COO is João Eduardo de Azevedo Silva.

References 

Companies based in São Paulo
Companies listed on B3 (stock exchange)
Real estate companies of Brazil
Construction and civil engineering companies of Brazil
Construction and civil engineering companies established in 2002
Brazilian companies established in 2002